The Employment Agencies Act 1973 (c.35) is a United Kingdom Act of Parliament and part of a wider body of UK agency worker law. It regulates the conduct of employment agencies which recruit and manage temporary and permanent labour. It applies to approximately 17,000 employment agencies operating in the UK. It was introduced by a private member's bill by Kenneth Lewis, member of parliament for Rutland and Stamford.

History

Introduction
In its original form, the Act provided for a system of licensing. Each business which wanted to set up an employment agency was required to have a license which would be denied or revoked if set standards (e.g. no registration fees for workers; no advertising of non-existent jobs) were not followed. The Act came at the same time as similar reforms around Europe, for instance, the German Arbeitnehmerüberlassungsgesetz (Employee Hiring Law of 1972).

Regulations prescribing further detailed rules were implemented in 1976.

Amendments
In 1994, the Conservative government, in its deregulation drive, abolished the system of licenses with the Deregulation and Contracting Out Act 1994. Instead, enforcement of regulations would rely on the Employment Agency Standards Inspectorate.

In 1999 the Employment Relations Act 1999 s.31 with Sch. 7 empowering the Secretary of State to make further regulations affecting agencies and their workers.

In 2003 new regulations were introduced, replacing those from 1976. The Conduct of Employment Agencies and Employment Businesses Regulations 2003 prohibit the charging of fees, except in a small number of mostly arts related professions (e.g. modelling). The additions made in 2003 were few, primarily relating to confidentiality of information and candidate qualification checks.

See also
 UK labour law
 UK agency worker law
 Gangmasters (Licensing) Act 2004
 Temporary and Agency Workers (Equal Treatment) Bill

Historical
Robert Owen
Labour Bureau (London) Act 1902
Labour Exchanges Act 1909
 Adams v. Tanner, 244 US 590 (1917), a US Supreme Court case where a conservative bench, with liberal judges dissenting, decided that a Washington state law prohibiting employment agencies was "unconstitutional".
 Unemployment Convention, 1919, after the ILO's first Recommendation, this called for public employment agencies to be established with a monopoly
 Fee-Charging Employment Agencies Convention, 1933 (shelved)
 Fee-Charging Employment Agencies Convention (Revised), 1949
 Private Employment Agencies Convention, 1997 (n.b. the UK never signed up to any of these ILO conventions)

Notes

External links
 Directgov site on "what is an agency worker?"
DBERR's website for the Employment Agency Standards Inspectorate
 Employment Agency Standards Inspectorate guidance

United Kingdom Acts of Parliament 1973
Temporary employment agencies
United Kingdom labour law
Employment agencies of the United Kingdom